Lechón is a municipality located in the province of Zaragoza, Aragon, Spain. According to the 2010 census, the municipality has a population of 57 inhabitants.
Its postal code is 50369.

See also
Campo de Daroca
List of municipalities in Zaragoza

References

External links
CAI Aragon - Lechón
Lechón - Tourism

Municipalities in the Province of Zaragoza